Feiver Mercado (born 1 June 1990) is a Colombian professional footballer who plays as a forward for Liga Nacional club Malacateco.

External links 
 

1990 births
Living people
Colombian footballers
Categoría Primera A players
Categoría Primera B players
América de Cali footballers
Cortuluá footballers
Deportes Quindío footballers
Deportivo Cali footballers
Deportivo Pasto footballers
Association football forwards
People from Atlántico Department
21st-century Colombian people